The Kincardine Bulldogs are a Canadian Junior ice hockey team based in Kincardine, Ontario.  They play in the Provincial Junior Hockey League which is an amalgamation of all former junior C leagues in Southern Ontario including the Bulldogs former Western Junior C Hockey League.

History
From 1975 until 1986, the Kincardine Kinucks played in the Central Junior "C" and Grey-Bruce Junior "C" Hockey League.  They won the league title in 1979.  They made it all the way to the Clarence Schmalz Cup All-Ontario Final where they lost to the Bowmanville Eagles in a four-game sweep.  The team folded in 1986.

In 1994, Kincardine came back to the Junior "C" loop, now called the Western Junior "C" Hockey League.  After taking three seasons to find their niche in the league, the Bulldogs won the league championship five of the next six seasons.  In 1998, the Bulldogs made it all the way to the All-Ontario Championship but lost out to the Glanbrook Rangers 4-games-to-1.  The Bulldogs were 2006 and 2007 Western Junior "C" Champions.  

In 2004-05, the Bulldogs finished the regular season in second place.  Their semi-final match up was against the third seeded Hanover Barons.  The Bulldogs defeated the Barons 4-games-to-1.  In the league final, the Bulldogs were up against the first seeded Wingham Ironmen.  The Ironmen defeated the Bulldogs 4-games-to-3 to win the Western Junior C championship.

The 2005-06 season saw the Bulldogs finish off second in the regular season standings and have a bye through the league quarter-finals.  In the semi-final, the Bulldogs locked horns with the third seeded Hanover Barons.  The Barons did not prove much of a challenge as the Bulldogs walked through them 4-games-to-none.  In the final, the Bulldogs were up against the first seeded Wingham Ironmen.  The Bulldogs, despite being the lower seed managed to knock off the Ironmen in 5 games, 4-games-to-1, to win the league and enter into the All-Ontario playdowns for the Clarence Schmalz Cup.  In the All-Ontario quarter-final, the Bulldogs ran into the Georgian Mid-Ontario Junior C Hockey League's Penetang Kings.  Despite a valiant effort by the Bulldogs, the Kings ended their season 4-games-to-2.

The 2006-07 regular season ended with the Bulldogs atop the Western Junior C standings.  With a bye in the quarter-finals, the Bulldogs faced a Hanover Barons squad just fresh off of eliminating the Mount Forest Patriots.  The Bulldogs kept it quick and beat the Barons 4-games-to-1.  In the final, the Bulldogs met the Walkerton Hawks.  The Hawks had just finished their best season in years, and were looking for more.  The Bulldogs curtailed the Hawks and beat them 4-games-to-1 for a second straight league title.  In the All-Ontario playdowns, the Bulldogs again locked horns with the Georgian Mid-Ontario Junior C Hockey League's Penetang Kings.  Everything seemed in hand for the Bulldogs, who by game four were leading the series 3-games-to-1.  To the Bulldog's dismay, the Kings roared back and won three straight to win the series 4-games-to-3.

During the summer of 2016 the eight junior "C" leagues in Southern Ontario came together as the Provincial Junior Hockey League.  The former leagues became divisions and assigned to one of four conferences. For the Bulldogs it means they will compete in the Western Conference and the Pollock Division.

Season-by-season standings

(*) The 1999-00 Season was altered drastically due to the folding of the Lakeshore Pirates.  As a disproportionate number of games had been played by each team against Lakeshore, all history of these games were erased.
1974-1981, 1982-1986, & 1994-1996
1981-1982
1996-2004
2004–Present

Clarence Schmalz Cup appearances
1979: Bowmanville Eagles defeated Kincardine Kinucks 4-games-to-none
1998: Glanbrook Rangers defeated Kincardine Bulldogs 4-games-to-1

References

External links
Bulldogs Webpage

Ice hockey teams in Ontario
1994 establishments in Ontario